The Reconstruction of Religious Thought in Islam is a compilation of lectures delivered by Muhammad Iqbal on Islamic philosophy and published in 1930. These lectures were delivered by Iqbal in Madras, Hyderabad, and Aligarh. The last chapter, "Is Religion Possible", was added to the book from the 1934 Oxford Edition onwards.

In Reconstruction, Iqbal called for a re-examination of the intellectual foundations of Islamic philosophy. The book is a major work of modern Islamic thought. It was a major influence on Iranian sociologist Ali Shariati and other contemporary Muslim reformers, including Tariq Ramadan.

Chapters
 Knowledge and Religious Experience
 The Philosophical Test of the Revelations of Religious Experience
 The Conception of God and the Meaning of Prayer
 The Human Ego – His Freedom and Immortality
 The Spirit of Muslim Culture
 The Principle of Movement in the Structure of Islam
 Is Religion Possible?
Translation: This book was translated into Persian by Mohamad Masud Noruzi in 2011.

Reviews and criticism
D.S. Margoliouth, an orientalist and a professor of Arabic at the University of Oxford, wrote "From the Qur'anic law of inheritance which makes the share of the male equal to that of two females the superiority of the male over the female has been inferred; such an assumption would, Sir M.Iqbal observes, be controversial to the spirit of Islam."The Qur'an says: And for women are rights over men similar to those for men over women." William Owen Carver (1898-1943) observed "His [Iqbal's] aim was "to reconstruct Muslim religious philosophy with due regard to the philosophical traditions of Islam and the more recent developments of human knowledge." Edward Hulmes noted "One of the author’s [Iqbal's] motives was to encourage his fellow countrymen to explore their own cultural roots after years of British colonial rule. But his aim was also to transcend the limited boundaries of national identity in order to ‘build bridges’ between peoples of different cultures and religious traditions."

Syed Abul Hasan Ali al Hasani al Nadwi has written in his book Glory of Iqbal that there are certain ideas of Iqbal that he does not agree with. He is especially critical of these lectures.

In the same book, Syed Abul Hasan a footnote also mentions that his mentor, Syed Sulaiman Nadwi used to wish that it would have been better if these lectures had not been published.

Editions
 Iqbal, Muhammad. The Reconstruction of Religious Thought in Islam. Kitab Bhavan, 2000. .

Bibliography
 Raschid, M.S. Iqbal's Concept of God. London: KPI, 1981. .

See also 
 Index of Muhammad Iqbal–related articles

References

External links

Read online (Warning:  Copyright protected in the U.S. until 2025)
 The Reconstruction of Religious Thought in Islam, Read online at Iqbal Academy Pakistan
 The Reconstruction of Religious Thought in Islam, Read online at Iqbal Cyber Library
 The Reconstruction of Religious Thought in Islam, Read online at International Iqbal Society's Website
 The Reconstruction of Religious Thought in Islam, Read online at YesPakistan
 Deconstructing Iqbal's Reconstruction
 تجدید فکریات اسلام Read online Urdu translation of The Reconstruction of Religious Thought in Islam at Iqbal Cyber Library

1930 non-fiction books
Philosophy books
Books by Muhammad Iqbal
Islamic theology books
Political manifestos